Stan McKenzie may refer to:
Stan McKenzie (basketball) (1944–2021), an American retired basketball player.
Stan McKenzie (footballer) (1896–1985), Australian rules footballer who played with Collingwood and Hawthorn 
Stanley McKenzie (1890–1915), Australian cricketer and footballer for Launceston and Carlton.